Seelze is a railway station located in Seelze, Germany. The station is located on the Hanover–Minden railway and the Bremen–Hanover railway. The train services are operated by Deutsche Bahn as part of the Hanover S-Bahn. Seelze is served by the S1 and S2.

References

Railway stations in Lower Saxony
Hannover S-Bahn stations
Railway stations in Germany opened in 1847